CHON-FM is a Canadian radio station, owned by Northern Native Broadcasting, Yukon which broadcasts at 98.1 FM in Whitehorse, Yukon. A community radio station with a variety of music and information programs for the First Nations population, the radio station serves much of the Yukon, as well as several border communities in British Columbia and the Northwest Territories, through a series of rebroadcasters.

The station was licensed in 1984 to broadcast on 88.9 MHz in Whitehorse and moved to its current frequency in 1986.

Rebroadcasters
CHON has the following rebroadcasters:

British Columbia

Northwest Territories

Yukon

References

External links
chonfm.com
Northern Native Broadcasting, Yukon
 CHON-FM history - Canadian Communications Foundation

Hon
Hon